Transtillaspis cholojuxta is a species of moth of the family Tortricidae. It is found in Peru.

The wingspan is about 20 mm. The ground colour of the forewings is whitish, preserved in the form of spots along the costa. The remaining area is suffused brown, dotted with dark brown and ferruginous. The hindwings are dark greyish brown.

Etymology
The species name refers to the unequal processes of the juxta and is derived from Greek cholos (meaning lame).

References

Moths described in 2010
Transtillaspis
Taxa named by Józef Razowski